Francisco Pascual Eyegue Obama Asue (born 21 April 1949) is an Equatoguinean politician who was Prime Minister of Equatorial Guinea from 2016 to 2023. Prior to holding this position, he was the Minister of Health and Social Welfare and also the Minister of Trade.

References 

1949 births
Democratic Party of Equatorial Guinea politicians
Living people
Prime Ministers of Equatorial Guinea